Elbora, an Ancient (Latinized) Celtiberian name, may refer to the following Iberian places :

 Évora, capital of the southern Portuguese Alentejo region
 Talavera de la Reina, a city and municipality in the western part of the province of Toledo, in the autonomous community of Castile–La Mancha, central Spain